Almas Transparentes is the debut studio album by Christian Chávez. It was released on March 23, 2010. The name of the album reflects a range of feelings that inspired this young talent.

"This album is dedicated to the relationship that had, at the end of RBD, and this decade, it was very difficult. It's been 10 years flying." Christian Chávez noted. The singer ventured to enter into the composition of some of his songs and said that "It was like the trigger and let go of the dirty water".

The album's first single "¿En Dónde Estás?" was released in January, 2010. According to the singer, the single's theme is about  indifference. "The first song is a 'ballad', and I think everyone will like, the whole world," he said. Christian Chávez made the video shoot for the song "¿En Donde Estas?" For he chose a spot in the city of Chimalhuacan, State of Mexico. During the shooting, he spoke of the importance of demonstrating their musical work and stressed he did not want to be recognized for their sexual preferences, but for his talent.

Track listing

Personnel
Iván Aguirre – photography
Loris Ceroni – arranger, keyboards, programming, producer, mixing, recording
Gigi Fazio – chorus
Alvaro González – A&R
Fernando Grediaga – A&R
Mario Neri – arranger, keyboards, producer
Mike Marsh – mastering
Brad Myrock – guitar, arranger, producer
Claudio Passavanti – arranger, keyboards, producer, pre-production
Daniel C. Peralta – design
Livio Perrotta – arranger, keyboards, producer, pre-production
Ricky Rinaldi – pre-production
Daniel Suarez – general coordination
Pablo Vega – management

Charts

References

2010 debut albums
Christian Chávez albums